During the 1997–98 English football season, Brentford competed in the Football League Second Division. Just 11 wins in 46 matches saw the club relegated to the Third Division on the final day of the season.

Season summary
After defeat in the 1997 Second Division play-off Final, David Webb, Brentford manager since the beginning of the 1993–94 season, moved "upstairs" to become the club's new chief executive, having acquired a majority shareholding of the club as part of a consortium with Tony Swaisland (chairman) and John Herting (director) in August 1997. Within days of the takeover and still without a manager, the spine of the previous season's team (Carl Asaba, Barry Ashby and Paul Smith) were sold for six-figure fees, with Brian Statham sold later in the month and promising youngster Marcus Bent transfer-listed. Replacements were found in the lower divisions, non-League and in Premier League reserve teams, with Paul Barrowcliff, Derek Bryan, Leon Townley, Ricky Reina and Charlie Oatway arriving for five-figure fees. First team coach Kevin Lock took caretaker charge of the club until the appointment of Eddie May just four days before the season began, with Clive Walker installed as May's assistant.

A 3–0 defeat to Millwall on the opening day saw Brentford begin the season bottom of the Second Division and despite registering two wins in late-August and early-September to move into mid-table, just two wins in the following 13 matches in all competitions saw May and Walker removed from their posts on 4 November. Amidst rumours that David Webb had fallen out with chairman Swaisland, Webb resigned as chief executive, but remained on the board of directors. Former Swansea City manager Micky Adams was installed as manager and fared little better, failing to win until mid-December.

In a bid to strengthen the team, Adams sought experienced players, signing Glenn Cockerill as player/assistant manager, Warren Aspinall and loanee Nigel Gleghorn. Injuries soon began to mount, with first-choice right back Ijah Anderson and summer signings Derek Bryan and Ricky Reina succumbing. Continuing player sales and bad results led some Bees supporters to call for the removal of David Webb, by staging multiple protests over a disparity between the incoming and outgoing transfer fees and questioning where the incoming money was going.

It wasn't until late-January 1998 that the team found some form, losing just once in 12 matches, but registering seven draws. Brentford went into the final day of the season one place above the relegation zone, having won just one of the previous four matches. A win away to play-off contenders Bristol Rovers (themselves needing to win) or other favourable results were required for the Bees to regain their Second Division status, but a 2–1 defeat and victory for 22nd-place Burnley relegated the club to the Third Division for the first time in 20 years.

League table

Results
Brentford's goal tally listed first.

Legend

Pre-season and friendlies

Football League Second Division

FA Cup

Football League Cup

Football League Trophy

 Sources: Soccerbase, 11v11, Griffin Gazette, The Big Brentford Book of the Nineties

Playing squad 
Players' ages are as of the opening day of the 1997–98 season.

 Source: Soccerbase

Coaching staff

Kevin Lock (1 – 12 August 1997)

Eddie May (12 August – 5 November 1997)

Micky Adams (5 November 1997 – 2 May 1998)

Statistics

Appearances and goals
Substitute appearances in brackets.

 Players listed in italics left the club mid-season.
 Source: Soccerbase

Goalscorers 

 Players listed in italics left the club mid-season.
 Source: Soccerbase

Discipline

 Players listed in italics left the club mid-season.
 Source: Soccerbase

International caps

Management

Summary

Transfers & loans

Kit

|
|

Awards 
 Brentford Supporters' Player of the Year: Carl Hutchings
 Brentford Internet Supporters' Player of the Year: Carl Hutchings
 Brentford Programme's Star Man of the Year: Carl Hutchings
 Eric White Memorial Trophy: Glenn Cockerill
 Football League Second Division Manager of the Month: Micky Adams (March 1998)

References

Brentford F.C. seasons
Brentford